Little Witch in the Woods is an indie life simulation video game developed and published by South Korean studio Sunny Side Up. It launched in early access in mid-2022 for Windows, Xbox One and Xbox Series X/S, and is scheduled for full release in 2023. The game follows Ellie, an apprentice witch who lives in a forest, wears a talking witch hat named Virgil, and is able to fish and brew potions. She must complete her training by helping nearby villagers and meeting other witches.

Reception 
The game was positively received by critics in early access, receiving comparisons with Stardew Valley due to its pixel-art aesthetic and gameplay. Alice Bell of Rock Paper Shotgun said that she "can't get over how lovely it is", and that the trailer had an "impeccable sense of comedic timing". Hope Bellingham of GamesRadar+ called the game "similar to a pixel-art version of Kiki's Delivery Service", and remarked that it was a "cozy game" that they "definitely recommend". Glenn Wilson of Gamezebo called the game's day/night system "clever", as it changes the behavior of the game's creatures. Lauren Morton of PC Gamer called the game's look "undeniably cute" with "some pretty swell tunes".

References 

Upcoming video games scheduled for 2023
Early access video games
Fantasy video games
Indie video games
Life simulation games
Single-player video games
Video games about witchcraft
Video games developed in South Korea
Video games featuring female protagonists
Windows games
Xbox One games
Xbox Series X and Series S games